The 1986–87 season was Kilmarnock's 85th in Scottish League Competitions.

Scottish First Division

Scottish League Cup

Second round

Scottish Cup

See also 
List of Kilmarnock F.C. seasons

References

External links 
https://www.fitbastats.com/kilmarnock/team_results_season.php

Kilmarnock F.C. seasons
Kilmarnock